The First Church of Christ, Wethersfield, is an American Colonial Era church in the Old Wethersfield Historic District of Wethersfield, Connecticut. The congregation was founded in 1635, and the present Georgian style brick meetinghouse was built in 1761–1764 with its distinctive white steeple. The church cemetery also dates from the 1600s. The interior of the meetinghouse was built as a crosswise room (Querkirche), altered considerably in 1838 and 1882, and returned to the original layout in 1971–1973.

According to a plaque at the tower entrance door, George Washington attended church there on May 20, 1781, during a conference with Count de Rochambeau at the nearby Joseph Webb House to plan the conclusion of the American Revolutionary War.

John Adams visited Wethersfield resident and envoy to France Silas Deane in 1774 and wrote in his diary: “We went up the steeple of Wethersfield meeting-house, from whence is the most grand and beautiful prospect in the world, at least that I ever saw.”

The church and its Austin organ hosted the first eighteen years of the Albert Schweitzer Organ Festival USA. This competition for young organists has been held annually since 1998 in the Hartford area, and was co-founded by First Church music minister David Spicer.

The congregation was affiliated with the United Church of Christ from 1961 through 2004 when the congregation overwhelmingly voted to break away citing theological and social differences, including gay marriage.

References

External links 
 

1630s establishments in Connecticut
Churches completed in 1761
Churches in Hartford County, Connecticut
United Church of Christ churches in Connecticut
Wethersfield, Connecticut